Sanyan-e Sofla (also Romanized as Sānyān-e Soflá; also known as Sānyān-e Pā'īn) is a village in Barvanan-e Gharbi Rural District, Torkamanchay District, Meyaneh County, East Azerbaijan Province, Iran. At the 2006 census, its population was 494, in 100 families.

References 

Populated places in Meyaneh County